DXLK (103.9 FM), broadcasting as 103.9 Gold FM, is a radio station owned by Kalayaan Broadcasting System and operated by One Accord Mass Media Management.  The station's studio is located in COMPHIL Compound, Purok Kauswagan, Brgy. Apopong, General Santos.

This station was an affiliate of Mango Radio from 2010 to 2013, when One Accord Mass Media Management took over the station's operations and renamed it as Gold FM.

References

Radio stations in General Santos
Radio stations established in 2010